Liocarcinus vernalis, the grey swimming crab, is a small, shallow-water crab in the family Portunidae. L. vernalis was thought for a long time to be a predominantly Mediterranean species, but its known range was extended by a series of observations in the 1980s and 1990s. It ranges from West Africa to the southern North Sea.

References

Portunoidea
Crustaceans of the Atlantic Ocean
Crustaceans described in 1816
Taxa named by Antoine Risso